Dry Bones that Dream is the seventh novel by Canadian detective fiction writer Peter Robinson in the Inspector Banks series. It was published in 1994, and re-named Final Account in the US and Canada.

External links
Dedicated page on author's website

1994 Canadian novels
Novels by Peter Robinson (novelist)
Novels set in Yorkshire
Viking Press books